This is a list of "Live with Regis and Kelly" episodes which were broadcast during the show's 17th season.  The list is ordered by air date.

Although the co-hosts may have read a couple of emails during the broadcast, it does not necessarily count as a "Regis and Kelly Inbox" segment.

September 2004

October 2004

November 2004

December 2004

January 2005

February 2005

March 2005

References

2004 American television seasons
2005 American television seasons